Ann Hjort (born ) is a Danish actress best known for her role as Puk in the 1989 television series Nissebanden i Grønland.

Hjort was educated at Aarhus Theatre in 1983. Whilst filming Nissebanden i Grønland she met her (now ex-) husband Finn Nielsen. In 1989-1990 she starred in the musical Kielgasten with Kim Larsen and others.

She has also voiced many cartoons including The Lion King and The Pink Panther.

Movies 
 Når engle elsker (1985) – Meta Nielsen
 Kærlighed ved første desperate blik (1994)
 Belma (1995) – Nurse
 Kandidaten (2008) – Eva Schiller
 En enkelt til Korsør (2008) – Birthe

TV series 
 Nissebanden i Grønland (julekalender) (1989) – Puk
 Hvide løgne (1998) – Helle Blom, doctor
 Finn'sk fjernsyn (1999) – Different roles
 Rejseholdet, afsnit 28 (2002) – Vibs
 Nikolaj og Julie, afsnit 18 (2003) – Doctor
 Ørnen, afsnit 4 (2004) – Doctor Susanne Helmer
 Klovn, afsnit 23 og 28 (2006) – Ann
 Lærkevej, 5 afsnit (2009) – Lizzie
 Store Drømme (2009) - Sofias mom

Cartoons 
 Scooby Doo – Vera
 Max og Mule (1992) – Pia
 Løvernes Konge (1994) – Sarafine
 Toy Story (1995) – Bodil
 Dexters Laboratorium (1996) – Mom
 Hercules (1997) – Hera
 Ko og Kylling (1997-2001) – Mom/mrs teacher
 Johnny Bravo (1997) – Bunny Bravo/Lille Suzie
 Pokémon (1998) – Jessie
 Toy Story 2 (1999) – Bodil
 Hercules (2000-2003) – Some voices
 Cubix (2001-2005) – Hela Nemo
 Kim Possible (2002) – Bonnie
 Jungledyret Hugo (2003-2004) – Some voices
 Der var engang..., afsnit 12–14, 22-23 (2005) – Some voices
 Spionfamilien (2007) – Talia Bannon

References
  

1956 births
Living people
20th-century Danish actresses
Danish voice actresses
Danish television actresses
Place of birth missing (living people)
21st-century Danish actresses
Danish film actresses